Trotz alledem is German for "despite everything". It can refer to:

 Trotz alledem, a German version of the Burns song A Man's A Man for A' That which was popular during the 1848 revolutions
 Karl Liebknecht - Trotz alledem!, the second film in the Karl Liebknecht series

See also
 Trotz Allem, a German youth club